This is a list of cable television providers by country.

Andorra
Mútua Elèctrica(Cable Mútua), Sant Julià de Lória)

Argentina
Cablevisión
DirecTV

Gigared
Telered

Australia
Foxtel
Fetch TV

Austria
BKF
LIWEST
Salzburg AG
Magenta Telekom

Azerbaijan 
 KATV1

Barbados
 Columbus Communications (FLOW) / Karib Cable - A division of Liberty Global
 Cable & Wireless Communications (LIME) - A division of Liberty Global
 Other (Escrowed) - As a condition of merger between Columbus Communications / Karib Cable / Flow, the combined entity must spin-off a portion of the network to a suitable candidate due to anti-monopoly policy set out by the Barbados Fair Trading Commission.

Belgium
 Orange Belgium - the second largest mobile operator in Belgium since 2016; operates as a "Cable Virtual Network Operator" (CVNO) using VOO and Telenet networks
 Telenet - in Flanders, Brussels region and Hainaut province. It is the third mobile operator with Base
 VOO - in Wallonia and in some localities of the Brussels region

Bosnia and Herzegovina
Cable and digital distribution:

 ZipZap d.o.o. - Zenica
 AMB-NET d.o.o. - Živinice
 ASK CATV d.o.o. - Ilidža
 Blic.net d.o.o. - Banja Luka
 CATV SAT d.o.o. - Brod
 ĆUTUK d.o.o. - Žepče
 DUOS - Pale
 ELING-KDS d.o.o. - Teslić
 ELKATEL d.o.o. - Tuzla
 ELNET d.o.o. - Laktaši
 ELTA-KABEL - Doboj
 ELTA-MT d.o.o. - Tuzla
 Europronet - Sarajevo 
 FOCUS-M d.o.o. - Milići
 GLOBAL INTERNET d.o.o. - Novi Travnik
 KT SARA d.o.o. - Drvar
 KTV E-G-E d.o.o. - Doboj Jug
 JU Dom Kulture - Žepče
 JU Dom Kulture "Edhem Mulabdić" - Maglaj
 MARIĆ-ŽEPČE d.o.o. - Žepče
 Media Sky - Živinice
 MISS.NET - Bihać
 Neon Solucije - Kalesija
 No Limit Technology d.o.o. - Sanski Most
 ORTAK d.o.o. - Šipovo
 STAR-TEL d.o.o. - Stolac
 STIJENA HERC d.o.o. - Ljubinje
 STOKIĆ d.o.o. - Doboj
 TEHNI-NET d.o.o. - Tržačka Raštela
 TEING d.o.o. - Prozor-Rama
 Telemach - Sarajevo (member of United Group)
 TELINEA - Sanski Most
 TELRAD NET d.o.o. - Bijeljina
 Terc Trade Kompani d.o.o. - Prnjavor
 TV-KABEL d.o.o. - Višegrad
 TX TV - Tuzla
 US TELCOM d.o.o. - Ključ
 WIRAC.NET - Gračanica

Defunct or merged:
 BH Cabel Net, Elob, Global Net, ART Net, Telekabel, Mo Net, VI-NET, HS Kablovska televizija, HKBnet, VELNET, VKT-Net, M&H Company, BHB CABLE TV - (merged with Telemach)
 KOMING-PRO - Gradiška (merged with Blic.net)

IPTV distribution:
 SUPER TV by LOGOSOFT Sarajevo
 Moja TV & Moja webTV by BH Telecom Sarajevo
 Open IPTV by M:tel Banja Luka
 HOME.TV by HT Eronet Mostar

DTH distribution:
 Total TV BH Banja Luka (member of United Group)

Bolivia 
 COTAS TV Digital
 Movistar TV 
 Supercanal
 Inter Satelital

Brazil
Claro TV
NET
Oi TV
SKY Brasil
Vivo TV
Nossa TV
Algar Telecom

Bulgaria

Ariel TV
Asparuho NET
BalchikNet
blizoo
Bulsatcom
CableSat West
Calbe Com Holding
Centrum Group
ComNet
Coolbox
Delta
DigiCom
Dobrudja Cable
Escom
Evrotur Sat TV
Fiber1
KoresNet
LANUtra
M-sat Cable
MAXTelecom
Megalan
A1
N3
NET1
NetSurf
Networx
OnlineDirect
OrlandoNet
PanTelecom
PlayTime
RN Cable Net
Skat
SofiaNet
Sprint
TBK
TCV
Telecom Group
TelNet
TrakiaCable
Unex
Unics
VestiTel
VideoSat
Vivacom
WispBG

Canada

Access Communications - Saskatchewan
Bell Canada - Quebec and Ontario
Cable Axion - Quebec
Cablevision - Quebec
Cogeco Cable - Southern/Eastern Ontario and Central Quebec
DERYtelecom - Quebec
EastLink - Atlantic Canada and Greater Sudbury, Ontario
Coast Cable - British Columbia
Delta Cable - British Columbia; now part of Eastlink
Northern Cablevision - Alberta
Northwestel - Northern Alberta, Northern British Columbia, Yukon, Northwest Territories, and Nunavut
Novus Entertainment - Metro Vancouver
Rogers Cable - Greater Toronto Area, Ontario; London, Ontario; Ottawa, Ontario; New Brunswick; Newfoundland and Labrador
SaskTel - Saskatchewan
Shaw Communications - Western Canada, Northern Ontario
Shaw Direct

Tbaytel - Northern Ontario
Telus - British Columbia and Alberta
Vidéotron - Quebec and parts of Ontario
Westman - Brandon, Manitoba and surrounding areas
VMedia - Ontario, Quebec, Manitoba, Saskatchewan, Alberta and British Columbia
Zazeen - Quebec and Ontario
Execulink Telecom - Ontario
Comwave - Ontario
Atop TV 
Teksavvy - Ontario

Defunct

Access - Nova Scotia
Cablecasting
Cablenet
CF
Classicomm
Compton Communications
Fundy Cable
Garnet Cable
Killaloe Cable
MacLean-Hunter Cablesystems
Moffat Broadcasting
Northern
Rush
Selkirk
Trillium Cable
VIC Communications
Videon

Chile
Telefónica del Sur
Entel
Tigo TV 
Movistar
Claro TV
CMET
GTD Manquehue
Mundo Pacífico
TV RED
VTR

Croatia
Dastin 
Terrakom
Vipnet B.net
B.net (the merger of DCM and Adriatic Kabel)
Optima
Hrvatski Telekom

Cyprus
Cablenet
 Cyta
 PrimeTel

Czech Republic

ATS, s.r.o.
Dattel, a.s.
Dattel Kable Gts telecom
Elsat, s.r.o.
InterCable CZ
K + K Cable, v.o.s.
Kabel Net Holding, a.s.
Kabel plus (Cable plus)
Kabel Plus Střední Morava, a.s.

Karneval
KT DAKR, s.r.o.
KT Ostrava Jih, s.r.o.
NejTV a.s.
Pilskabel, a.s.
TES Litvínov, s.r.o.
UPC Czech Republic

Denmark
ComX Networks A/S
Tele 2
Telia
Stofa
Waoo
YouSee

Estonia
AS Fill
AS Starman
AS STV
Elion Enterprises Limited
ITTU Inteko
OÜ Lassonia
Telset AS

Finland

DNA OYJ
ElisaCom Oy
Etelä-Satakunnan Puhelin Oy
Forssan Seudun Puhelin Oy
Hämeen Puhelin Oy
Iisalmen Puhelin Oy
Jyväsviestintä Oy
Kajaanin Puhelinosuuskunta
Kokkolan Puhelin Oy
Kotkan Tietoruutu Oy
KPY Kaapelitelevisio Oy
Kuopion Kaapelitelevisio
Lännen Puhelin Oy
Lohjan Puhelin Oy
Mariehamns Centralantenn Ab
Mikkelin Puhelin Oyj
Oulu-TV Oy
Päijät-Visio Oy
Pietarsaaren Seudun Puhelin Oy
Pohjanmaan PPO Oy
Pohjois-Hämeen Puhelin Oy
Riihimäen Puhelin Oy
Salon Seudun Puhelin Oy
Savonlinnan Puhelin Oy
Sonera Plaza (TeliaSonera Finland Oyj)
Teljän Mediat Oy
Tikka Media Oy
TTV Tampereen Tietoverkko Oy
Turun Kaapeli-TV (Turun Kaapelitelevisio Oy)
Vaasan Läänin Puhelin Oy

France
SFR
Outguesses Telecom
Orange S.A.
Free (ISP)
Canalsat

Germany

Bosch Telekom
Cable One
SkyDSL
Deutsche Telekom
GdW Bundesverband
Kabel & Medien Service (Munich)
Kabel Deutschland
KomRo (Rosenheim)
Primacom
Tele Columbus
Unitymedia

Hong Kong
CableTV
HKBN
PCCW
SuperSUN
Now TV

Hungary

Antenna Hungária (MinDig TV, the free terrestrial digital broadcasting)
Délkábel Kft.
DIGI Kft. (formerly known as Egyesült Magyar Kábeltelevízió)
DSP Befektető Rt.
HCS
Invitel Távközlési Zrt.
KableVision
KFKI Számitástechnikai Rt.
Magyar Telekom NyRt. (formerly known as T-Home, T-Kábel, and MatávKábelTV)
Németkábel Vagyonkezelő Rt.
PR Telecom Zrt
Szélmalom Kábeltévé
UPC Magyarország

India

 Kfon
 Digiana Projects Private Limted
 RCCNetwork Cable & Broadband Services, Nagpur
 A.Ptv Network
 AD Group Cable Network
 Advanced Multisystem Broadband Communication Pvt. Ltd
 Arasu Cable
 Arkays Digital Media Cable
 Asianet Satellite Communications Limited
 Atria Convergence Technologies
 Barasat Cable TV Network Pvt. Ltd
 CableComm Services Pvt. Ltd
 ChandparaCable TV Network Ltd
 Channel 3
 Darsh Digital Cable Network
 Darshan Pooja Cable TV Network
 DEN Networks
 Dew Shree Network
 Digi Maharaja Cable Network
 DIGICON
 DL GTPL Cabnet Pvt. Ltd
 Dolly Cable Network
 DWL - Digital Space Link
 Fastway Transmissions Pvt. Ltd.
 Gujarat Telelink P Limited (GTPL)
 Hathway
 Home Cable Network Pvt Limited
 ICE TV Pvt
 IndusInd Media & Communication Ltd (IMCL)
 Intermedia Cable Communication Pvt. Ltd. (ICC)
 JAK Communications
 JPR Channel
 Kailash Cable Network P Ltd
 Kal Cables Pvt. Ltd.                          
 Kerala Communicators Cable Ltd
 Kolkata Cable & Broadband Pariseva Ltd
 Link Entertainment (Howrah Cable)
 Live Satellite
 Manthan Digital/Manthan Broadband Services Pvt Ltd
 Marine BizTV
 Mohit Cable Vision
 NXT Digital (Hinduja-HITS network) 
 Ortel Communications
 Prem Channels Pvt Ltd
 Ravi Cable Network
 Ramtek City Cable Network      
 Reliance Digicom (ex Digicable)
 RVR Infra
 Sanjay Cable Network Pvt Ltd
 Satellite Vision Cable TV & Broadband Services
 Satellite Vision Pvt Limited
 SCV
 Seven Star Dot Com Pvt Ltd
 Silver Line Broadband Services P Ltd
 Siti Cable (Siti Network Limited)
 Siti Vision Digital Media
 Spectra Net Ltd
 Star Broadband Services (India) P Ltd
 STV Network
 TACTV
 UCN Cable Network Pvt. Ltd
 Universal Communication System
 U-Digital Network Pvt Ltd.
 Kee DIGITAL CABLE  KHANDWA MP
 SKY DIGITAL CABLE TV SUPPORT (All India Service)

Indonesia

Biznet Home
First Media
IndiHome TV
MNC Play
DensTV
MyRepublic

Israel
Hot
Yes
Cellcom TV
Partner TV
Next TV
Sting TV

Italy
Sky omc

Ireland

Largest (available nationally)
Eir
Sky Ireland
Virgin Media Ireland

Smaller independent cable operators
 Magnet Entertainment (IPTV over fiber FTTH)
 Smart Telecom (IPTV over fiber FTTH)
 Smyth Cablevision

Defunct Irish cable companies (mostly gradually merged into what is now Virgin Media Ireland)
Cablelink (rebranded as NTL)
Casey Cablevision (acquired by Virgin in 2018)
Chorus Communications (became UPC in 2007)
CMI (Cable Management Ireland)(merged to form Chorus)
Cork Multichannel/Cork Communications (became Chorus)
East Coast Multichannel (merged to form Chorus)
Horizon (merged to form Chorus)
Irish Multichannel (merged to form Chorus)
Marlin CATV (merged to form Cablelink)
NTL Ireland (became UPC in 2007)
Phoenix Relays (merged to form Cablelink)
Ren-Tel Cablevision (The Rank Organisation; merged to form Cablelink)
RTÉ Relays (merged to form Cablelink)
Sky Scan Cablenetwork Kumaramputhur (merged to form Cablelink)
 SCTV Digital (Cork)(Went bankrupt in 2010)
Westward Cable (merged to form Chorus)

Japan

 Bay Communication
 BB Cable
 Cable Networks Akita
 CCJ
 Cyubu Cable
 iTSCOM (ITS Communication)
 Japan Cable Net (KDDI)
 JCOM (Jupiter)
 K-CAT
 NNS
 StarCat Cable Network Co.
 Tokai Cable
 Usen Corporation

Kazakhstan 
 Alma tv
 Kazaktelecom

Kosovo
IPKO
Kujtesa

Lithuania

Balticum (acquired Rygveda)
Cgates Group (Cgates, Mikrovisata, Kavamedia, Satela, Ukmerges televizija, Rakaras, UKMNET) - largest cable company in the country
Elekta
Eteris
Funaris
Ignalinos televizija
Ilora
Init Group (Init, Vinita, Dokeda, Druskininku Televizija)
KLI LT
Lansneta
Marsatas
Parabolė
Roventa
Splius
Televizijos komunikacijos
TEO AB - largest TV operator in the country (IPTV and DTT networks)
Transteleservis
Viasat (only DTH operator)
Viltuva
Zirzilė

North Macedonia
Telekabel

Malaysia
Astro
Unifi TV

Maldives
SatLink

Malta
 Melita

Mexico
Dish México
Izzi Telecom
Megacable
SKY México
Totalplay
StarTV
Telecable (México)

Monaco
MC Cable

Netherlands

Regional
Cable companies that serve a larger area:
 Caiway - Westland
 DELTA - Zeeland
 Kabel Noord - north-east Friesland
 Ziggo - largest cable company in the Netherlands in multiple regions

Local
Cable companies which only serve one municipality or town:
 CAI Assendorp - Assendorp-Zwolle
 CAI Bleiswijk - Bleiswijk (digital services by Ziggo)
 CAI Edam-Volendam - Edam-Volendam (digital services by Ziggo)
 CAI Harderwijk - Harderwijk
 Cogas KTMO - Almelo (digital services by CAIW)
 Groenstichting Rozendaal - Rozendaal (services by Ziggo)
 Kabelnet Veendam - Veendam
 Kabeltelevisie Waalre - Waalre (services by Ziggo)
 Kabeltex - Texel
 KTV Pijnacker - Pijnacker
 Rekam - Gouda

New Zealand
Freeview NZ (free to air television)
SKY Network Television (satellite television)
TelstraClear (digital cable television)
Vodafone New Zealand (digital cable television)

Nigeria

CONSAT TV
DaarSat
DStv
GoTV
MyTV
StarSat
StarTimes

Defunct
HiTV

Norway
Altibox
Canal Digital AS
Get AS
Homebase
RiksTV

Panama 

 Cable & wireless Panama
 Cable Onda

Paraguay 
 Consorcio Multipunto Multicanal 
 Saturn Cable Televisión

Philippines

Cablelink
Destiny Cable
Parasat Cable TV
Sky Cable

Poland

 ASTA-NET
 ELSAT
 INEA
 Jambox
 KORBANK
 Netia
 Petrus
 Promax 
 Ultra HD Sat
 UPC Poland
 Vectra

Portugal
NOWO
MEO
NOS - Zon and Optimus fusion in 2014
Vodafone

Romania

Akta S.A
Analog S.A.
Astral TV SRL (UPC)
Canad Systems Ltd
Conex Sat Ltd
Cony Sat S.A & Megaconstruct S.A.
cRD S.A.
CVR S.A.
Delta TV Ltd
Digital 3 S.A.
FX Communication S.A.
RCS & RDS
Satba Ltd
Seltron Ltd
Strorm TV Ltd (UPC)
Telekom Romania
TV Cablu Ltd
TVS Holding Ltd 
UPC Romania (FX Internet Ltd, CVR S.A., Canad Systems Ltd, Digital 3 S.A, Genius Ltd.,Seltron Ltd, Portal Ltd, Analog S.A., Diplomatic Ltd, EuroSat Ltd, Satba Ltd, Conex Sat Ltd, Satline Co. SRL Călărași)

Singapore
StarHub TV
Singtel TV

Slovakia

ANTIK
Digi TV Slovakia
Orange Slovensko
SATRO
Skylink
Slovak Telekom
Slovanet
SWAN
UPC Broadband Slovakia

Slovenia

AMIS d.o.o.
ANSAT d.o.o.
ARIO d.o.o.
CATV SELNICA-RUŠE d.o.o.
DOMCOMMERCE d.o.o.
DRUŠTVO KKS PRAGERSKO-GAJ
DRUŠTVO uporabnikov KTV Ekran
Društvo za razvoj kabelsko distribucijskega sistema Črna na Koroškem
EKDS d.o.o.
ELCATEL d.o.o.
ELEKTRO TURNŠEK, d.o.o., Celje
ELEKTRONIKA - KATV d.o.o.
ELSTIK d.o.o.
ELTA d.o.o.
EVJ ELEKTROPROM d.o.o.
GOROSAN ELEKTRONSKE KOMUNIKACIJE d.o.o.
INATEL d.o.o.
INTEL Branko Šetinc s.p.
KA-TV TOLMIN
KABEL TV d.o.o.
KABELSKA TELEVIZIJA NOVA GORICA
KABELSKA TELEVIZIJA RADENCI
KATV BOVŠKE, BOVEC
KATV LIVADE d.o.o.
KKS d.o.o.
KKS RADEČE d.o.o.
KKS SLIVNICA d.o.o.
KRAJEVNA SKUPNOST CERKNO
KRS d.o.o.
KRS LENART d.o.o.
KTV ORMOŽ
KTV RAVNE d.o.o.
KTV ŠENTJAŽ
M3-NET d.o.o.
NAKLO d.o.o.
OMREŽJE d.o.o.
P&ROM d.o.o.
SANMIX d.o.o. Cerknica
SKYLINE d.o.o.
STUDIO PROTEUS, d.o.o., POSTOJNA
SVISLAR TELEKOM d.o.o.
T-2 d.o.o.
TELE-TV d.o.o.
TELEING d.o.o.
TELEKOM SLOVENIJE d.d.
TELEMACH d.o.o.
TELES d.o.o.
TELESAT d.o.o.
TOTAL TV d.o.o.
TRNOVEC MILAN s.p.
TUŠMOBIL d.o.o.
ZAVOD KABELSKE TELEVIZIJE, NHM SEVNICA
ZAVOD KTV NA JAMI, LJUBLJANA
ZAVOD ZA RAZVOJ KABELSKO-SATELITSKO TELEVIZIJSKEGA sistema Kamnik

South Africa
Multichoice
DStv
GoTV
Showmax
StarSat
Openview HD

South Korea 

 LG U+
 SK Broadband
 SkyLife
 Olleh TV

Spain

National
Vodafone (All regions except the Basque Country, Asturias, Galicia, Extremadura, Ceuta and Melilla)
Regional
Euskaltel (Basque Country)
R (Galicia)
Telecable (Asturias)

Sri Lanka

Ask Cable Vision (Digital & Analog)

Sweden
Canal Digital
Com Hem
SAPPA
Tele2Vision

Switzerland
Finecom
Naxoo
Swaztervizion
UPC Switzerland

Tanzania
 Tabora Television Broadcasting Co, Ltd, Tabora Region, Tanzania
 Digital System

Thailand
GMMZ
PSI
SunBox
TrueVisions

Trinidad and Tobago
Amplia (Massy Communications)
Bmobile (TSTT)
Columbus Communications (Flow Trinidad)
Digicel Play
Green Dot

Turkey
Digiturk
 Dsmart
Tivibu
Turksat A.S.

United Kingdom
 BT 
Virgin Media
 Sky 
 TalkTalk

United States

Uruguay
MutiTel

Vietnam
VTV: VTVCab, SCTV 
HTV: HTVC
Other: Hanoicab (from SCTV), NTH, NACab, GKC, CTD Tay Do... (VTVCab or SCTV network), VTC-CEC (CEC or VTC Digital old)

References

 
Lists of companies by industry